DZKI (1332 AM) Radyo Ronda is a radio station owned and operated by the Radio Philippines Network. The station's studio is located at the RPN Regional Broadcast Center, Bonacua Bldg., Iriga-Baao Rd., Brgy. San Nicolas, Iriga, and its transmitter is located in Brgy. San Roque, Iriga.

References

Radio stations in Camarines Sur
Radio Philippines Network
RPN News and Public Affairs
Radio stations established in 1968
News and talk radio stations in the Philippines